This article lists the presidents of Equatorial Guinea, a country in the Gulf of Guinea and on the western equatorial coast of Central Africa, since the establishment of the office of president in 1968. Francisco Macías Nguema was the first person to hold the office, taking effect on 12 October 1968. The incumbent is Teodoro Obiang Nguema Mbasogo, having taken office on 3 August 1979.

List of officeholders
Political parties

Other factions

Timeline

Latest election

See also

 Politics of Equatorial Guinea
 Vice President of Equatorial Guinea
 List of prime ministers of Equatorial Guinea
 List of colonial governors of Spanish Guinea

Notes

References

External links
 World Statesmen – Equatorial Guinea

 
Equatorial Guinea
1968 establishments in Equatorial Guinea
Presidents
Presidents